Cora Almerino is a Cebuano Visayan writer. Her poems were included in Sinug-ang: A Cebuano trio published by Women in Literary Arts in 1999.

References

Year of birth missing (living people)
Living people
Visayan writers
Cebuano writers
Filipino writers
Filipino women writers
Cebuano people